Steinitz may refer to:

 Steinitz, Germany, a town in the district of Altmarkkreis Salzwedel in Saxony-Anhalt in Germany
 Steinitz (surname)